Colonial Court is a bungalow court located at 291–301 N. Garfield Ave. in Pasadena, California. The court consists of six houses arranged around a narrow courtyard. The houses are designed in the Colonial Revival style and feature clapboard siding and jerkinhead roofs. Built in 1916, the homes were designed by architect Cyril Bennett.

The court was added to the National Register of Historic Places on July 11, 1983.

References

External links

Bungalow courts
Bungalow architecture in California
Houses in Pasadena, California
Houses completed in 1916
Houses on the National Register of Historic Places in California
National Register of Historic Places in Pasadena, California
Colonial Revival architecture in California